Issachar was, according to the Book of Genesis, a son of Jacob and Leah (the fifth son of Leah, and ninth son of Jacob), and the founder of the Israelite tribe of Issachar.

Issachar or Yissakhar may also refer to:

Issachar Baer Berenstein
Issachar Bär ben Judah Carmoly
Issachar Bates
Issachar ben Mordecai ibn Susan
Issachar Ber Ryback
Issachar Berend Lehmann
Issachar Berman ben Naphtali ha-kohen
Issachar Jacox Roberts
Issachar Miron, Israeli-American composer, the author of the music of the song Tzena, Tzena, Tzena 
Issachar Perlhefter (c.1650 – after 1713), also known as Behr Perlhefter, Sabbatean rabbi from Prague

Fictional characters
Don Issachar, minor Jewish character in Voltaire's Candide
Isaachar, in Andrew Lloyd Webber's Joseph and the Amazing Technicolor Dreamcoat

See also